Route 390, also known as Springdale Road, is a highway in the central portion of Newfoundland in the Canadian province of Newfoundland and Labrador.  It is a very short route, running for only , with its only community, Springdale, as its terminus.  Its branch routes, Route 391 (Harry's Harbour Road) and Route 392 (Beachside Road), run for a much longer distance.

Route description

Route 390 begins in a rural area at an intersection with Route 1 (Trans-Canada Highway) and it heads northeast to cross Indian Brook and have an intersection with Route 391 (Harry's Harbour Road). Springdale Airport can be accessed from the highways southern terminus by traveling 1 kilometre west on Route 1. The highway heads northeast through wooded areas for a few kilometres, paralleling the Indian Brook, to enter the Springdale town limits and have an intersection with Route 392 (Beachside Road). Route 390 passes through some business districts and neighbourhoods, where it passes by George Huxter Memorial Park, before entering downtown and coming to an end at a Y-Intersection with Main Street in downtown.

Major intersections

References

390